Long Live the Family! is a 2011 Czech crime film directed by Robert Sedláček. The film won the Czech Film Critics' Award for the best film of 2011.

Plot
Libor Pokorný works in a bank. A few billion Czech crowns disappeared from the bank as a result of fraud that he was involved in. The fraud is investigated by two police officers. He realises that he will go to prison. He persuades his wife Iva to take their family for a trip but doesn't tell her of his situation. Police realise that he is on the run. Libor can't leave the republic due to his daughter's health but he tries to solve his situation. He avoids police and tries to hide the truth from his family. They eventually come across old friends Lenka and Jiří. They sleep over at their place and celebrate the reunion. Libor tells Jiří of his situation. Jiří agrees to lend him his car. Libor asks Iva if she would stay faithful to him when he would have to leave the family for a few years. She doesn't respond. Next day Libor and his family leave. Libor wants to go to Slovakia. The family accommodates at a hotel. There Iva finds out the truth. She has an argument with Libor. Police find out that Libor is at the hotel but he and his family manage to escape. Iva decides to stay by her husband and helps him to escape. Their car crashes to a tree. There Libor admits to his wife that he was involved with the fraud and that he wanted to prepare his family for his arrest. Before the police arrests Libor, Iva responds to his previous question - her life has meaning only with him.

Cast
Igor Chmela as Libor Pokorný
Eva Vrbková as Iva Pokorná
Martin Finger as the Investigator
Monika A. Fingerová as the female Investigator
Albert Mikšík as Lukáš Pokorný
Kristýna Tomíčková as Tina Pokorná
Simona Babčáková as Lenka
Jiří Vyorálek as Jiří

References

External links
 

2011 films
2011 crime thriller films
Czech crime thriller films
2010s Czech-language films
Czech Film Critics' Awards winners
Czech road movies
2010s road movies